|}

The Bateaux London Gold Cup is a Premier Handicap National Hunt race in Great Britain. It is a handicap steeplechase and is run at Ascot in late October or early November, over a distance of about 3 miles (2 miles, 7 furlongs and 180 yards, or 4,791 metres).

History

The race was first run as the United House Gold Cup on 28 October 2006 as a Class 2 race. It was worth £100,000 and was run over three miles. In 2009 the race was upgraded to Listed class and was further upgraded to Grade 3 in 2011. Sodexo sponsored the race from 2015 to 2020 and Bateaux London have been the sponsors since 2021.

Records
Most successful horse:
 no horse has won the race more than once

Leading jockey (3 wins):
 Barry Geraghty – Roll Along (2008), Roberto Goldback (2012), Pendra (2015)

Leading trainer (3 wins):
 Gary Moore - Antony (2016), Traffic Fluide (2018), Larry (2021)

 Widest winning margin – Roberto Goldback (2012) – 9 lengths
 Narrowest winning margin – Harris Bay (2007) – neck
 Most runners – 17, in 2011
 Fewest runners – 9, in 2007

Winners

See also
 Horse racing in Great Britain
 List of British National Hunt races

References

 Racing Post:

National Hunt races in Great Britain
National Hunt chases
Ascot Racecourse
2006 establishments in England
Recurring sporting events established in 2006